Guitang station is a subway station in Changsha, Hunan, China, operated by the Changsha subway operator Changsha Metro.

Station layout
The station has two island platforms.

History
The station opened on 26 May 2019.

Surrounding area
 Hunan Guangyi Experimental Middle School
 Changsha Mass Art Museum
 Changsha Experimental Theatre
 Shazitang Jilian School

References

Railway stations in Hunan
Railway stations in China opened in 2019